Liberal Reformist Party may refer to:
 Liberal Reformist Party (Belgium) (Parti Réformateur Libéral), defunct party in Belgium 1971–2002
 Liberal Reformist Party (Dominican Republic) (Partido Reformista Liberal), political party in the Dominican Republic
 Liberal Reformist Party (Puerto Rico) (Partido Liberal Reformista), defunct party in Puerto Rico 1870s
 Liberal Reformist Party (Romania) (Partidul Liberal Reformator), defunct party in Romania 2014–2015
 Liberal Reformist Party (Spain) (Partido Liberal Reformista), defunct party in Spain 1886–1906
 Romanian Popular Party, formerly known as Liberal Reformist Party (Partidul Liberal Reformator), political party in Moldova